Hail to the Chief is an American sitcom that aired on ABC from April 9 to May 21, 1985. It centred around the President of the United States, portrayed by Patty Duke. The series was created by Susan Harris, and was produced by Witt/Thomas/Harris Productions. It featured one of the few recurring gay characters in a 1980s television series (Randy, the Secret Service Agent portrayed by Joel Brooks).

Synopsis
Hail to the Chief is similar in style to the TV sitcom, Soap (from the same producers as this series), in that it was a comedy with open-ended storylines that parodied a soap opera.  Patty Duke had the starring role as the President, Julia Mansfield. The show focused on President Mansfield's attempt at balancing her political career with raising her family.

Cast and characters
Patty Duke as President Julia Mansfield 
Ted Bessell as First Gentleman Oliver Mansfield
Quinn Cummings as Lucy Mansfield
Ricky Paull Goldin as Doug Mansfield
Taliesin Jaffe as Willy Mansfield
Dick Shawn as Ivan Zolotov
Glynn Turman as Secretary of State LaRue Hawkes
Herschel Bernardi as Helmut Luger
Murray Hamilton as Senator Sam Cotton
Richard Paul as Reverend Billy Joe Bickerstaff
John Vernon as General Hannibal Stryker
Jonna Lee as Muffin Stryker
Joel Brooks as Randy

Production

Casting
Patty Duke was cast as President Julia Mansfield. Ted Bessell was cast as First Gentleman Oliver Mansfield. Quinn Cummings was cast as Lucy Mansfield. Ricky Paull Goldin was cast as Doug Mansfield.

Episodes

Reception

Critical response
John J. O'Connor of The New York Times wrote in his review: "Hail to the Chief features Patty Duke as the first female President of the United States surrounded by assorted misfits in a format that is intended to be, as they like to say, zany and irreverent. This one's sour, to say the least. [...] As for Hail to the Chief, there hasn't been anything so furiously wacky on prime-time television since Soap got a broad cross-section of protest groups worked up almost a decade ago - even before the show went on air. Not surprisingly, both series come out of Witt/Thomas/Harris Productions. Susan Harris is the creator and writer. Paul Junger Witt and Tony Thomas are the producers. It is perhaps a sign of the times that Hail to the Chief, which goes several kinky steps beyond the outrageousness of Soap, is making its debut without so much as a raised eyebrow, even though the advertisements for the equal opportunity offender promise that you'll say, I thought they couldn't do that on TV."

Ratings
Hail to the Chief, which featured Patty Duke as the President, got off to a very good start, attracting 32% of the available viewers and winning its time period for the April 9 premiere. But it drew only 24% the following week, 23% for the third episode and 22% for the fourth.

Cancellation
Hail to the Chief was canceled in May 1985 after seven episodes. ABC continued to air repeats of the series through July 20, 1985.

References

Citations

Sources

External links
 

1980s American LGBT-related comedy television series
1980s American political comedy television series
1980s American satirical television series
1980s American sitcoms
1985 American television series debuts
1985 American television series endings
American Broadcasting Company original programming
English-language television shows
Political satirical television series
Television series about families
Television shows set in Washington, D.C.
White House in fiction
American LGBT-related sitcoms
1980s LGBT-related sitcoms